Put Ilyicha is a rural locality (a selo) and the administrative center of Ilyichyovskoye Rural Settlement, Nikolayevsky District, Volgograd Oblast, Russia. The population was 1,565 as of 2010. There are 18 streets.

Geography 
Put Ilyicha is located on Transvolga, 51 km southeast of Nikolayevsk (the district's administrative centre) by road. Stepnovsky is the nearest rural locality.

References 

Rural localities in Nikolayevsky District, Volgograd Oblast